Urocyon (Greek: "tailed dog") is a genus of Canidae which includes the gray fox (Urocyon cinereoargenteus) and the island fox (Urocyon littoralis). These two fox species are found in the Western Hemisphere. Whole genome sequencing indicates that Urocyon is the most basal genus of the living canids. Fossils of what is believed to be the ancestor of the gray fox, Urocyon progressus, have been found in Kansas and date to the Upper Pliocene, with some undescribed specimens dating even older.

Extant species

Extinct species

Cozumel fox
The Cozumel fox is a critically endangered or extinct small gray fox found on the island of Cozumel, Mexico. 
The last reported sighting was in 2001, but surveys focusing on this species have not yet been carried out.

The Cozumel fox has not been scientifically described, but is a dwarf form as is the island fox, but slightly larger being up to three-quarters the size of the gray fox. No skins or complete skulls of the Cozumel fox exist in any museum exhibitions, so scientists have mainly examined sub-fossils collected during archaeological excavations of Mayan civilizations who inhabited the island about 1,500–500 years ago. Upon evaluating bones from about 12 adult individuals, scientists have concluded that the Cozumel fox is extremely small – approximately 60-80% the body size of other mainland specimens.

The fox had been isolated on the island of Cozumel for at least 5,000 years, and probably far longer. This would indicate that Urocyon had colonized the island before the first arrival of humans there.

References

Foxes
Mammal genera
Taxa named by Spencer Fullerton Baird